Contemporary Educational Psychology is a peer-reviewed academic journal on the topic of educational psychology. Its editor-in-chief is Patricia Alexander (University of Maryland).

The journal was first published in 1976 for disseminating research and review articles relevant to educational psychology. It is considered one of the "big five" educational psychology journals (along with Educational Psychology Review, Journal of Educational Psychology, Educational Psychologist, and Cognition and Instruction).

References 

Educational psychology journals
Elsevier academic journals
Publications established in 1976